Mayi Bas (also Romanized as Mayī Bas; also known as Māhī Bas) is a village in Dodangeh Rural District, in the Central District of Behbahan County, Khuzestan Province, Iran. At the 2006 census, its population was 63, in 11 families.

References 

Populated places in Behbahan County